The U-Turn Infinity is a German single-place paraglider, designed and produced by U-Turn GmbH of Villingen-Schwenningen. It was the first glider introduced by the company in 2003 and remained in production in 2016 as the Infinity 4.

Design and development
The Infinity was designed as an intermediate glider.

The design has progressed through four generations of models, the Infinity, Infinity 2, 3 and 4, each improving on the last. The Infinity 4 was a complete redesign and not just an evolution of previous versions. The models are each named for their relative size.

Operational history
Reviewer Noel Bertrand noted the Infinity's distinctive wing graphics in a 2003 review as "easily recognizable" and noted that the design is "quick and full of promise".

Variants

Infinity
Infinity S
Small-sized model for lighter pilots. The glider model is Deutscher Hängegleiterverband e.V. (DHV) 1-2 certified.
Infinity M
Mid-sized model for medium-weight pilots. The glider model is DHV 1-2 certified.
Infinity L
Large-sized model for heavier pilots. The glider model is DHV 1-2 certified.

Infinity 4
Infinity 4 XS
Small-sized model for lighter pilots. The glider model is not certified.
Infinity 4 S
Small-sized model for lighter pilots. The glider model is DHV LTF/EN-B certified.
Infinity 4 SM
Mid-sized model for medium-weight pilots. The glider model is DHV LTF/EN-B certified.
Infinity 4 M
Medium-sized model for heavier pilots. The glider model is DHV LTF/EN-B certified.
Infinity 4 L
Large-sized model for heavier pilots. The glider model is DHV LTF/EN-B certified.

Specifications (Infinity M)

References

External links

Infinity
Paragliders